The effects of climate change on agriculture can result in lower crop yields and nutritional quality due to drought, heat waves and flooding as well as increases in pests and plant diseases. The effects are unevenly distributed across the world and are caused by changes in temperature, precipitation and atmospheric carbon dioxide levels due to global climate change. In 2019, millions were already suffering from food insecurity due to climate change. Further, the predicted decline in global crop production is 2% - 6% with each decade. In 2019 it was predicted that food prices would rise by 80% by 2050. This will likely lead to increased food insecurity, disproportionally affecting poorer communities. A 2021 study estimated that the severity of heatwave and drought impacts on crop production tripled over the last 50 years in Europe – from losses of 2.2% during 1964–1990 to losses of 7.3% in 1991–2015.

Direct impacts from changing weather patterns are caused by rising temperatures, heat waves and changes in rainfall (including droughts and floods). Increased atmospheric  levels has led to higher crop yields (due to  fertilization) but has also resulted in reduced nutritional value of crops (lower levels of micronutrients). Climate driven changes in pests, plant diseases and weeds can also result in lower crop yields and nutritional value. Losses of agricultural land due to sea level rise is an indirect result of climate change. However, more arable land may become available as frozen land thaws, though melting glaciers could result in less irrigation water being available. Other impacts include erosion and changes in soil fertility and the length of growing seasons. Negative impacts on food safety and losses caused by fungi, leading to mycotoxins, and bacteria, like Salmonella, increase with as the climate warms; additional financial burdens result. Water scarcity – including disturbances of  – caused or worsened by climate change can have substantial negative impacts on agriculture.

A range of measures for climate change adaptation may reduce the risk of negative climate change impacts on agriculture. Those measures include changes in management practices, agricultural innovation, institutional changes, and climate-smart agriculture. To create a sustainable food system, these measures are considered as essential as changes needed to reduce global warming in general.

According to the IPCC Sixth Assessment Report: "Climate change impacts are stressing agriculture, forestry, fisheries, and aquaculture, increasingly hindering efforts to meet human needs."

Direct impacts from changing weather patterns

Rising temperatures 

Changes in temperature and weather patterns will alter areas suitable for farming. The current prediction is that temperatures will increase and precipitation will decrease in arid and semi-arid regions (Middle East, Africa, Australia, Southwest United States, and Southern Europe). In addition, crop yields in tropical regions will be negatively affected by the projected moderate increase in temperature (1-2 °C) expected to occur during the first half of the century. During the second half of the century, further warming is projected to decrease crop yields in all regions including Canada and the Northern United States. Many staple crops are extremely sensitive to heat and when temperatures rise over 36 °C, soybean seedlings are killed and corn pollen loses its vitality.

However, higher winter temperatures and more frost-free days in some regions would result in longer growing seasons. For example, a 2014 study found that maize yields in the Heilongjiang region of China increased by between 7 and 17% per decade as a result of rising temperatures.

Heat waves 

In the summer of 2018, heat waves probably linked to climate change greatly reduced average yield in many parts of the world, especially Europe. During the month of August, more crop failures resulted in a rise in global food prices. Wheat, rice and maize production failed to meet demand, forcing governments and food companies to release stocks from storage.

Heat stress of livestock 
Heat stress affects animal growth and reproduction, as well as their feed intake. In turn, this affects the production of dairy products and meat. Decreased food intake, lowered activity rate, and a drop in weight are all a result of heat stress. To ameliorate the decline in livestock productivity, animals need easy access to water and to have feeding times altered to cooler times of the day. Shelter with good air circulation also help combat heat stress. Livestock of various species differ in their ability to cope with heat stress.

Changes in rainfall (including droughts and floods) 

Droughts and floods contribute to decreases in crop yields. As extreme weather events become more common and more intense, floods and droughts can destroy crops and eliminate food supply, while disrupting agricultural activities and rendering workers jobless.  Drought in developing countries exacerbates pre-existing poverty and leads to famine and malnutrition.

Irrigation of crops is able to reduce or even remove the impacts on yields of lower rainfall and higher temperatures - through localised cooling.  However, using water resources for irrigation has downsides and is expensive. Also, the water must come from somewhere and if the area has been in a drought for a long time, the rivers may be dry and the irrigation water would have to be transported from further distances.

Droughts have been occurring more frequently because of global warming and they are expected to become more frequent and intense in Africa, southern Europe, the Middle East, most of the Americas, Australia, South and Southeast Asia. Their impacts are aggravated because of increased water demand, population growth, urban expansion in many areas. Droughts result in crop failures and the loss of pasture grazing land for livestock. Some farmers may choose to permanently stop farming a drought-affected area and go elsewhere.

At the beginning of the 21st century, floods probably linked to climate change shortened the planting season in the Midwest region in United States, causing damage to the agriculture sector. In May 2019 the floods reduced the projected corn yield from 15 billion bushels to 14.2. During the 2021 European floods, estimates pointed to severe damage to the agricultural sector of Belgium, one of the countries hardest hit by the floods, including long-term effects like soil erosion.

Changes in hail size 
In the northern United States, fewer hail days will occur overall due to climate change, but storms with larger hail might become more common. Hail larger than 1.6-inch can quite easily break glass, affecting greenhouses.

Direct impacts from increased atmospheric CO2 levels

Higher crop, grass and forestry yields due to CO2 fertilisation 
Elevated atmospheric carbon dioxide affects plants in a variety of ways. Elevated CO2 increases crop yields and growth through an increase in photosynthetic rate, and it also decreases water loss as a result of stomatal closing.

Reduced nutritional value of crops 

Changes in atmospheric carbon dioxide may reduce the nutritional quality of some crops, with for instance wheat having less protein and less of some minerals.  Food crops could see a reduction of protein, iron and zinc content in common food crops of 3 to 17%. This is the projected result of food grown under the expected atmospheric carbon-dioxide levels of 2050. Using data from the UN Food and Agriculture Organization as well as other public sources, the authors analyzed 225 different staple foods, such as wheat, rice, maize, vegetables, roots and fruits. The effect of projected for this century levels of atmospheric carbon dioxide on the nutritional quality of plants is not limited only to the above-mentioned crop categories and nutrients. A 2014 meta-analysis has shown that crops and wild plants exposed to elevated carbon dioxide levels at various latitudes have lower density of several minerals such as magnesium, iron, zinc, and potassium.

Studies using Free-Air Concentration Enrichment have also shown that increases in CO2 lead to decreased concentrations of micronutrients in crop and non-crop plants with negative consequences for human nutrition, including decreased B vitamins in rice. This may have knock-on effects on other parts of ecosystems as herbivores will need to eat more food to gain the same amount of protein.

Climate change induced drought stress in Africa will likely lead to a reduction in the nutritional quality of the common bean. This would primarily impact on populations in poorer countries less able to compensate by eating more food, more varied diets, or possibly taking supplements.

Climate driven changes in pests, plant diseases and weeds (indirect impacts) 

Global warming will alter pest, plant disease and weed distributions, with potential to reduce crop yields, including of staple crops like wheat, soybeans, and corn.

Pest insects 

Currently, pathogens take 10-16% of the global harvest and this level is likely to rise as plants are at an ever-increasing risk of exposure to pests and pathogens. Warmer temperatures can increase the metabolic rate and number of breeding cycles of insect populations. Insects that previously had only two breeding cycles per year could gain an additional cycle if warm growing seasons extend, causing a population boom. Temperate places and higher latitudes are more likely to experience a dramatic change in insect populations. Some insect species will breed more rapidly because they are better able to take advantage of such changes in conditions.

Studies have shown that when  levels rise, soybean leaves are less nutritious; therefore plant-eating beetles have to eat more to get their required nutrients. In addition, soybeans are less capable of defending themselves against the predatory insects under high . The  diminishes the plant's jasmonic acid production, an insect-killing poison that is excreted when the plant senses it's being attacked. Without this protection, beetles are able to eat the soybean leaves freely, resulting in a lower crop yield. This is not a problem unique to soybeans, and many plant species' defense mechanisms are impaired in a high  environment.

Historically, cold temperatures at night and in the winter months would kill off insects, bacteria and fungi. The warmer, wetter winters are promoting fungal plant diseases like wheat rusts (stripe and brown/leaf) and soybean rust to travel northward. Soybean rust is a vicious plant pathogen that can kill off entire fields in a matter of days, devastating farmers and costing billions in agricultural losses. Another example is the Mountain Pine Beetle epidemic in British Columbia, Canada which killed millions of pine trees because the winters were not cold enough to slow or kill the growing beetle larvae.

The increasing incidence of flooding and heavy rains also promotes the growth of various other plant pests and diseases. On the opposite end of the spectrum, drought conditions favour different kinds of pests like aphids, whiteflies and locusts.

Locusts 
When climate change leads to hotter weather, coupled with wetter conditions, this can result in more damaging locust swarms. This occurred for example in some East African nations in the beginning of 2020.

Fall armyworms 
The fall armyworm, Spodoptera frugiperda, is  a highly invasive plant pest that has in the recent years spread to countries in Sub-Saharan African. The spread of this plant pest is linked to climate change as experts confirm that climate change is bringing more crop pests to Africa and it is expected that these highly invasive crop pests will spread to other parts of the planet since they have a high capacity to adapt to different environments. The fall armyworm  can have massive damage to crops, especially maize, which affects agricultural productivity.

Mountain Pine Beetle

Weeds, invasive species and plant pathogens 

Weeds undergo the same acceleration of cycles as cultivated crops, and would also benefit from CO2 fertilization. Since most weeds are C3 plants, they are likely to compete even more than now against C4 crops such as corn. However, weedkillers may increase in effectiveness with the temperature increase.

Global warming would cause an increase in rainfall in some areas, which would lead to an increase of atmospheric humidity and the duration of the wet seasons. Combined with higher temperatures, these could favour the development of fungal diseases. Similarly, because of higher temperatures and humidity, there could be an increased pressure from insects and disease vectors. Climate change has the capability of altering pathogen and host interactions, specifically the rates of pathogen infection and the resistance of the host plant. Also impacted by plant disease are the economic costs associated with growing different plants that might yield less profit as well as treating and managing already diseased crops.

Research has shown that climate change may alter the developmental stages of plant pathogens that can affect crops. Change in weather patterns and temperature due to climate change leads to dispersal of plant pathogens as hosts migrate to areas with more favourable conditions. This increases crop losses due to diseases.

A changing climate may favour the more biologically diverse weeds over the monocrops most farms consist of. Characteristics of weeds such as their genetic diversity, cross-breeding ability, and fast-growth rates put them at an advantage in changing climates as these characteristics allow them to adapt readily in comparison to most farm's uniform crops, and give them a biological advantage.

With the increased  levels, herbicides will lose their efficiency which in turn increases the tolerance of weeds to herbicides.

Technological solutions to pests and weeds 

There are a few proposed solutions to the issue of expanding pest populations (pest control). One proposed solution is to increase the number of pesticides used on crops. This has the benefit of being relatively cost effective and simple, but may be ineffective. Many pest insects have been building up a pesticide resistance. Another proposed solution is to utilize biological control agents. This includes things like planting rows of native vegetation in between rows of crops. This solution is beneficial in its overall environmental impact. Not only are more native plants getting planted, but pest insects are no longer building up an immunity to pesticides. However, planting additional native plants requires more room.

Other indirect impacts from changed conditions

Food security, undernutrition and food prices 

It is difficult to project the impact of climate change on utilization (protecting food against spoilage, being healthy enough to absorb nutrients, etc.) and on volatility of food prices. Most models projecting the future do indicate that prices will become more volatile. In 2019, millions suffered from food insecurity due to climate change. As of 2019, an estimated 831 million people are undernourished.Climate change impacts depend strongly on projected future social and economic development.

A study in 2019 showed that climate change has already increased the risk of food insecurity in many food insecure countries.

The IPCC Sixth Assessment Report in 2022 found that: "Climate change will increase loss of years of full health by 10% in 2050 under RCP8.5 due to undernutrition and micronutrient deficiencies (medium evidence, high agreement)."

Increasing food prices 
According to IPCC's Special Report on Climate Change and Land, food prices will rise by 80% by 2050 which will likely lead to food shortages. Food shortages will affect poorer parts of the world far more than richer ones.

Under a high emission scenario (RCP6.0), cereals are projected to become 1–29% more expensive in 2050 depending on the socioeconomic pathway, particularly affecting low-income consumers. Compared to a no climate change scenario, this would put between 1–181 million extra people at risk of hunger.

Higher food production costs 
With more costs to the farmer, some will no longer find it financially feasible to farm. Agriculture employs the majority of the population in most low-income countries and increased costs can result in worker layoffs or pay cuts. Other farmers will respond by raising their food prices; a cost which is directly passed on to the consumer and impacts the affordability of food. Some farms do not sell their produce but instead feed a family or community; without that food, people will not have enough to eat. This results in decreased production, increased food prices, and potential starvation in parts of the world.

Agricultural land loss from sea level rise 
A rise in the sea level would result in an agricultural land loss, in particular in areas such as South East Asia. Erosion, submergence of shorelines, salinity of the water table due to the increased sea levels, could mainly affect agriculture through inundation of low-lying lands.

Low-lying areas such as Bangladesh, India and Vietnam will experience major loss of rice crop if sea levels rise as expected by the end of the century. Vietnam for example relies heavily on its southern tip, where the Mekong Delta lies, for rice planting. A one metre rise in sea level will cover several square kilometres of rice paddies in Vietnam.

More arable land due to less frozen land 
Climate change may increase the amount of arable land by reducing the amount of frozen land. A 2005 study reports that temperature in Siberia has increased three-degree Celsius in average since 1960 (much more than the rest of the world). However, reports about the impact of global warming on Russian agriculture indicate conflicting probable effects: while they expect a northward extension of farmable lands, they also warn of possible productivity losses and increased risk of drought.

The Arctic region is expected to benefit from increased opportunities for agriculture and forestry.

Less irrigation water availability due to melting glaciers 
Some regions are heavily dependent on water runoff from glaciers that melt during the warmer summer months. Therefore, a continuation of the currently observed retreat of glaciers will eventually deplete the glacial ice and reduce or eliminate runoff. A reduction in runoff will affect the ability to irrigate crops and will reduce summer stream flows necessary to keep dams and reservoirs replenished.

In Asia, global warming of 1.5 °C will reduce the ice mass of Asia's high mountains by about 29-43%, with impacts communities that are dependent on glacier- and snow-melt waters for their livelihoods. In the Indus River watershed, these mountain water resources contribute to up to 60% of irrigation outside of the monsoon season, and an additional 11% of total crop production. Approximately 2.4 billion people live in the drainage basin of the Himalayan rivers. In India alone, the river Ganges provides water for drinking and farming for more than 500 million people.

Erosion and soil fertility 
The warmer atmospheric temperatures observed over the past decades are expected to lead to a more vigorous hydrological cycle, including more extreme rainfall events. Erosion and soil degradation is more likely to occur. Soil fertility would also be affected by global warming. Increased erosion in agricultural landscapes from anthropogenic factors can occur with losses of up to 22% of soil carbon in 50 years.

Climate change will also cause soils to warm. In turn, this could cause the soil microbe population size to dramatically increase 40–150%. Warmer conditions would favor growth of certain bacteria species, shifting the bacterial community composition. Elevated carbon dioxide would increase the growth rates of plants and soil microbes, slowing the soil carbon cycle and favoring oligotrophs, which are slower-growing and more resource efficient than copiotrophs.

Early blooms and effects on growing periods 

As a result of global warming, flowering times have come earlier, and early blooms can threaten the plants survival and reproduction. Early flowering increases the risk of frost damage in some plant species and lead to 'mismatches' between plant flowering and pollinators interaction. "Around 70% of the world's most produced crop species rely to some extent on insect pollination, contributing an estimated €153 billion to the global economy and accounting for approximately 9% of agricultural production". In addition, warmer temperatures in winter trigger many flowering plants to blossom, because plants need stimulation to flower, which is normally a long winter chill. And if a plant doesn't flower it can't reproduce. "But if winters keep getting milder, plants may not get cold enough to realize the difference when warmer springtime temperatures start".

Duration of crop growth cycles are above all, related to temperature. An increase in temperature will speed up development. In the case of an annual crop, the duration between sowing and harvesting will shorten (for example, the duration in order to harvest corn could shorten between one and four weeks). The shortening of such a cycle could have an adverse effect on productivity because senescence would occur sooner.

Changes in crop phenology provide important evidence of the response to recent regional climate change. Phenology is the study of natural phenomena that recur periodically, and how these phenomena relate to climate and seasonal changes. A significant advance in phenology has been observed for agriculture and forestry in large parts of the Northern Hemisphere.

Food safety and losses 
It is expected that there will be more food safety issues and losses caused by fungi, leading to mycotoxins, and bacteria, like Salmonella, that increase with climate warming.

Impacts of surface level ozone on crops 
Surface ozone is an air pollutant and a strong oxidant that reduces physiological functions, yield and quality of crops. It has increased substantially since the late 19th century. This is due to methane emissions which increase temperatures as a greenhouse gas and also increase surface ozone concentrations as a precursor.

Financial burden 
Many of the projected climate scenarios suggest a huge financial burden. For example, the heat wave that passed through Europe in 2003 cost 13 billion euros in uninsured agriculture losses. In addition, during El Nino weather conditions, the chance of the Australian farmer's income falling below average increased by 75%, greatly impacting the country's GDP. The agriculture industry in India makes up 52% of their employment and the Canadian Prairies supply 51% of Canadian agriculture; any changes in the production of food crops from these areas could have profound effects on the economy. This could negatively affect the affordability of food and the subsequent health of the population.

Global aggregate estimates for crop yields 
Climate change induced by increasing greenhouse gases is likely to differ across crops and countries. In 2019 a decline in global crop production of 2% - 6% by decade was predicted. A 2021 study estimates that the severity of heatwave and drought impacts on crop production tripled over the last 50 years in Europe – from losses of 2.2% during 1964–1990 to losses of 7.3% in 1991–2015.

As of 2019, negative impacts have been observed for some crops in low-latitudes (maize and wheat), while positive impacts of climate change have been observed in some crops in high-latitudes (maize, wheat, and sugar beets). Using different methods to project future crop yields, a consistent picture emerges of global decreases in yield. Maize and soybean decrease with any warming, whereas rice and wheat production might peak at 3 °C of warming.

A study in 2019 tracked ~20,000 political units globally for 10 crops (maize, rice, wheat, soybean, barley, cassava, oil palm, rapeseed, sorghum and sugarcane), providing more detail on the spatial resolution and a larger number of crops than previously studied. It found that crop yields across Europe, Sub-Saharan Africa and Australia had in general decreased because of climate change (compared to the baseline value of 2004–2008 average data), though exceptions are present. The impact of global climate change on yields of different crops from climate trends ranged from -13.4% (oil palm) to 3.5% (soybean). The study also showed that impacts are generally positive in Latin America. Impacts in Asia and Northern and Central America are mixed.

Earlier predictions (prior to 2014) 
In 2007 it was predicted that over the first few decades of this century, moderate climate change would increase aggregate yields of rain-fed agriculture by 5–20%, but with important variability among regions. Projections at the same time also suggested that there could be large decreases in hunger globally by 2080, compared to the (then-current) 2006 level. Reductions in hunger were driven by projected social and economic development. Projections also suggested regional changes in the global distribution of hunger. By 2080, sub-Saharan Africa may overtake Asia as the world's most food-insecure region. This is mainly due to projected social and economic changes, rather than climate change.

Major challenges were projected for crops that are near the warm end of their suitable range or which depend on highly utilized water resources. With low to medium confidence, they concluded that for about a 1 to 3 °C global mean temperature increase (by 2100, relative to the 1990–2000 average level) there would be productivity decreases for some cereals in low latitudes, and productivity increases in high latitudes. In the report, "low confidence" means that a particular finding has about a 2 out of 10 chance of being correct, based on expert judgement. "Medium confidence" has about a 5 out of 10 chance of being correct. Over the same time period, with medium confidence, global production potential was projected to increase up to around 3 °C, and very likely decrease above about 3 °C.

In 2014, it was predicted that future climate changes were most likely affecting crop production in low latitude countries negatively, while effects in northern latitudes may be positive or negative.

The US National Research Council assessed the literature on the effects of climate change on crop yields in 2011. Their central estimates of changes in crop yields are shown below. Actual changes in yields may be above or below these central estimates. A meta-analysis in 2014 revealed consensus that yield is expected to decrease in the second half of the century, and with greater effect in tropical than temperate regions. 

Three scenarios without climate change (SRES A1, B1, B2) projected 100-130 million people undernourished by the year 2080, while another scenario without climate change (SRES A2) projected 770 million undernourished. Based on an expert assessment of all of the evidence, these projections were thought to have about a 5-in-10 chance of being correct. The same set of greenhouse gas and socio-economic scenarios were also used in projections that included the effects of climate change. Including climate change, three scenarios (SRES A1, B1, B2) projected 100-380 million undernourished by the year 2080, while another scenario with climate change (SRES A2) projected 740–1,300 million undernourished. These projections were thought to have between a 2-in-10 and 5-in-10 chance of being correct.

Impacts on forests and forestry 

The IPCC Sixth Assessment Report in 2022 found that: "In the past years, tree mortality continued to increase in many parts of the world. Large pulses of tree mortality were consistently linked to warmer and drier than average conditions for forests throughout the temperate and boreal biomes. Long-term monitoring of tropical forests indicates that climate change as begun to increase tree mortality and alter regeneration. Climate related dieback has also been observed due to novel interactions between the life cycles of trees and pest species.

Adaptation

Changes in management practices 
Adaptation in agriculture is often not policy driven, but farmers make their own decisions in response to the situation they face. Changes in management practices might be the most important adaptation option.Changes in locations of agriculture and international trade in food commodities might also contribute to adaptation efforts.

Agricultural innovation 
Agricultural innovation is essential to addressing the potential issues of climate change. This includes better management of soil, water-saving technology, matching crops to environments, introducing different crop varieties, crop rotations, appropriate fertilization use, and supporting community-based adaptation strategies. On a government and global level, research and investments into agricultural productivity and infrastructure must be done to get a better picture of the issues involved and the best methods to address them. Government policies and programs must provide environmentally sensitive government subsidies, educational campaigns and economic incentives as well as funds, insurance and safety nets for vulnerable populations. In addition, providing early warning systems, and accurate weather forecasts to poor or remote areas will allow for better preparation.

Institutional changes 
A mere focus on agricultural technology will not be sufficient. Work is underway to enable and fund institutional change, and to develop dynamic policies for long-term climate change adaptation in agriculture.

A 2013 study by the International Crops Research Institute for the Semi-Arid Tropics aimed to find science-based, pro-poor approaches and techniques that would enable Asia's agricultural systems to cope with climate change, while benefiting poor and vulnerable farmers. The study's recommendations ranged from improving the use of climate information in local planning and strengthening weather-based agro-advisory services, to stimulating diversification of rural household incomes and providing incentives to farmers to adopt natural resource conservation measures to enhance forest cover, replenish groundwater and use renewable energy.

Climate-smart agriculture

Adaptation examples for specific crops

Adapting potato production 
Adaptation of potato farming practices and potato varieties to changing conditions caused by climate change could help maintain crop yields and allow potato to be grown in areas with predicted conditions unsuited to current commercial potato cultivars. Methods to adapt potatoes to climate change include shifting production areas, improving water use and breeding new tolerant potato varieties.

Potato yields are predicted to decrease in some areas (e.g. Sub-Saharan Africa) while increasing in others (e.g. northern Russia), mostly due to changes in water and temperature regimes. At the same time potato production is predicted to become possible in high altitude and latitude areas where it would previously have been limited by frost damage. These changes in crop yields are predicted to cause shifts in the areas in which potato crops can be viably produced.
In some countries reductions in yields caused by increased temperatures and decreased water availability could be avoided to a high degree by shifting potato production areas.
A potential problem in shifting potato production is competition for land between potato crops and other crops and other land uses.

Two main approaches are taken to create new potato varieties: 'traditional' plant breeding techniques and genetic modification. These techniques may play an important role in creating new cultivars able to maintain yields under stressors induced by climate change.

Traits that may be helpful in reducing negative impacts of climate on potato production include:
Heat stress tolerance, in particular the ability to maintain tuber growth and initiation under high temperatures. Developing cultivars with greater heat stress tolerance is critical for maintaining yields in countries with potato production areas near current cultivars' maximum temperature limits (e.g. Sub-Saharan Africa,  India).
Drought tolerance. This includes better water use efficiency (amount of food produced per amount of water used) as well as potatoes that can be exposed to short drought periods and recover and produce acceptable yields. Deeper root systems could also be beneficial, as most commercial potato cultivars need frequent irrigation due to their shallow roots.
Fast growth/early maturation. Potatoes that grow faster could help adjust to shorter growing seasons in some areas and also reduce the number of life cycles pests such as potato tuber moth can complete in a single growing season.
Disease resistance. Potatoes with resistances to local pests and diseases could be helpful, especially in adapting to diseases spreading into new areas.

Adapting wine production 
Systems have been developed to manipulate the temperatures of vines. These include a chamber free system where air can be heated or cooled and then blown across grape bunches to get a 10 degree Celsius differential. Mini chambers combined with shade cloth and reflective foils have also been used to manipulate the temperature and irradiance. Using polyethylene sleeves to cover cordons and canes were also found to increase maximum temperature by 5-8 degrees Celsius and decrease minimum temperature by 1-2 degrees Celsius.

Crop examples

Rice

Wheat 

Climate change impacts on rainfed wheat will vary depending on the region and local climatic conditions. During the period 1981 to 2008, global warming has had negative impacts on wheat yield in especially tropical regions, with decreases in average global yields by 5.5%. 

Studies in Iran surrounding changes in temperature and rainfall are representative for several different parts of the world since there exists a wide range of climatic conditions. They range from temperate to hot-arid to cold semi-arid. Scenarios based on increasing temperature by up to 2.5 °C and rainfall decreases by up to 25% show wheat grain yield losses can be significant. The losses can be as much as 45% in temperate areas and over 50% in hot-arid areas. But in cold semi-arid areas yields can be increased somewhat (about 15%). Adaptation strategies with the most promise center around dates for seed planting. Late planting in November to January can have significant positive impacts on yields due to the seasonality of rainfall.

In the Indo-Gangetic plain of India, heat stress and water availability are predicted to have significant negative impacts on yield of wheat. Direct impacts of increased mean and maximum temperatures is predicted to reduce wheat yields by up to 10%. The impact of reduced availability of water for irrigation is more significant, running at yield losses up to 35%.  

For temperate zones, increases are predicted for example in the case of spring wheat in Canada (spring wheat is sown in spring). For the Ukraine where temperatures are increasing throughout the year and precipitation is predicted to increase, winter wheat yields (wheat sown in winter) could increase by 20-40% in the north and northwestern regions by 2050, as compared to 2010.

Grapevines (wine production) 
Grapevines (Vitis vinifera) are very responsive to their surrounding environment with a seasonal variation in yield of 32.5%. Climate is one of the key controlling factors in grape and wine production, affecting the suitability of certain grape varieties to a particular region as well as the type and quality of the wine produced. Wine composition is largely dependent on the mesoclimate and the microclimate and this means that for high quality wines to be produced, a climate-soil-variety equilibrium has to be maintained. The interaction between climate-soil-variety will in some cases come under threat from the effects of climate change. Identification of genes underlying phenological variation in grape may help to maintain consistent yield of particular varieties in future climatic conditions.

Of all environmental factors, temperature seems to have the most profound effect on viticulture as the temperature during the winter dormancy affects the budding for the following growing season. Prolonged high temperature can have a negative impact on the quality of the grapes as well as the wine as it affects the development of grape components that give colour, aroma, accumulation of sugar, the loss of acids through respiration as well as the presence of other flavour compounds that give grapes their distinctive traits. Sustained intermediate temperatures and minimal day-to-day variability during the growth and ripening periods are favourable. Grapevine annual growth cycles begin in spring with bud break initiated by consistent day time temperatures of 10 degrees Celsius. The unpredictable nature of climate change may also bring occurrences of frosts which may occur outside of the usual winter periods. Frosts cause lower yields and effects grape quality due to reduction of bud fruitfulness and therefore grapevine production benefits from frost free periods.

Organic acids are essential in wine quality. The phenolic compounds such as anthocyanins and tannins help give the wine its colour, bitterness, astringency and anti-oxidant capacity. Research has shown that grapevines exposed to temperature consistently around 30 degrees Celsius had significantly lower concentrations of anthocyanins compared to grapevines exposed to temperatures consistently around 20 degrees Celsius.  Temperatures around or exceeding 35 degrees Celsius are found to stall anthocyanin production as well as degrade the anthocyanins that are produced. Furthermore, anthocyanins were found to be positively correlated to temperatures between 16 – 22 degrees Celsius from veraison (change of colour of the berries) to harvest. Tannins give wine astringency and a "drying in the mouth" taste and also bind onto anthocyanin to give more stable molecular molecules which are important in giving long term colour in aged red wines.

As the presence of phenolic compounds in wine are affected heavily by temperature, an increase in average temperatures will affect their presence in wine regions and will therefore affect grape quality.

Altered precipitation patterns are also anticipated (both annually and seasonally) with rainfall occurrences varying in amount and frequency. Increases in the amount of rainfall have will likely cause an increase in soil erosion; while occasional lack of rainfall, in times when it usually occurs, may result in drought conditions causing stress on grapevines. Rainfall is critical at the beginning of the growing season for the budburst and inflorescence development while consistent dry periods are important for the flowering and ripening periods.

Increased CO2 levels will likely have an effect on the photosynthetic activity in grapevines as photosynthesis is stimulated by a rise in CO2 and has been known to also lead to an increase leaf area and vegetative dry weight. Raised atmospheric CO2 is also believed to result in partial stomatal closure which indirectly leads to increased leaf temperatures. A rise in leaf temperatures may alter ribulose 1,5-bisphosphate carboxylase/oxygenase (RuBisCo) relationship with carbon dioxide and oxygen which will also affect the plants' photosynthesis capabilities. Raised atmospheric carbon dioxide is also known to decrease the stomatal density of some grapevine varieties.

Cultivation variations 
The gradually increasing temperatures will lead to a shift in suitable growing regions. This has positive and negative effects, as it opens doors to new cultivars being grown in certain regions but a loss of suitability of other cultivars and may also risk production quality and quantity in general.

Potatoes 
Climate change is predicted to have significant effects on global potato production. Like many crops, potatoes are likely to be affected by changes in atmospheric carbon dioxide, temperature and precipitation, as well as interactions between these factors. As well as affecting potatoes directly, climate change will also affect the distributions and populations of many potato diseases and pests. Potato is one of the world's most important food crops. Unless farmers and potato cultivars can adapt to the new environment, the worldwide potato yield will be 18-32% lower than currently.

Potato plants and potato crop yields are predicted to benefit from increased carbon dioxide concentrations in the atmosphere.
The major benefit of increased atmospheric carbon dioxide for potatoes (and other plants) is an increase in their photosynthetic rates which can increase their growth rates. Potato crop yields are also predicted to benefit because potatoes partition more starch to the edible tubers under elevated carbon dioxide levels.
Higher levels of atmospheric carbon dioxide also results in potatoes having to open their stomata less to take up an equal amount of carbon dioxide for photosynthesis, which means less water loss through transpiration from stomata. As a result, the water use efficiency (the amount of carbon assimilated per unit water lost) of potato plants is predicted to increase.

Potatoes grow best under temperate conditions. Tuber growth and yield can be severely reduced by temperature fluctuations outside 5-30 °C. The effect of increased temperatures on potato production in specific areas will vary depending partly on the current temperature of that area. Temperatures above 30 °C can have a range of negative effects on potato, including: 
Slowing tuber growth and initiation.
Less partitioning of starch to the tubers.
Physiological damage to tubers (e.g. brown spots).
Shortened/non-existent tuber dormancy, making tubers sprout too early.
These effects can reduce crop yield and the number and weight of tubers. As a result, areas where current temperatures are near the limits of potatoes' temperature range (e.g. much of Subsaharan Africa) will likely suffer large reductions in potato crop yields in the future.
At low temperatures potatoes are at risk of frost damage, which can reduce growth and badly damage tubers. In areas where potato growth is currently limited or impossible due to risks of frost damage (e.g. at high altitudes and in high latitude countries such as Russia and Canada), rising temperatures will likely benefit potato crops by extending the growing season and extending potential potato growing land.

Potatoes are sensitive to soil water deficits compared to other crops such as wheat, and need frequent irrigation, especially while tubers are growing. Reduced rainfall in many areas is predicted to increase the need for irrigation of potato crops. For example, in the UK the amount of arable land suitable for rainfed potato production is expected to decrease by at least 75%.
As well as reductions in overall rainfall, potato crops also face challenges from changing seasonal rainfall patterns. For example, in Bolivia the rainy season has shortened in recent decades, resulting in a shorter potato growing season.

Changes in pests and diseases for potato crops 
Climate change is predicted to affect many potato pests and diseases. These include:
Insect pests such as the potato tuber moth and Colorado potato beetle, which are predicted to spread into areas currently too cold for them.
Aphids which act as vectors for many potato viruses and will also be able to spread under increased temperatures.
Several pathogens causing potato blackleg disease (e.g. Dickeya) can grow and reproduce faster at higher temperatures and so will likely become more of a problem.
Bacterial infections such as Ralstonia solanacearum are predicted to benefit from higher temperatures and be able to spread more easily through flash flooding.
Late blight benefits from higher temperatures and wetter conditions. Late blight is predicted to become a greater threat in some areas (e.g. in Finland ) and become a lesser threat in others (e.g. in the United Kingdom).

Regional impacts

Africa

Asia 
For East and Southeast Asia, an estimate in 2007 stated that crop yields could increase up to 20% by the mid-21st century. In Central and South Asia, projections suggested that yields might decrease by up to 30%, over the same time period. Taken together, the risk of hunger was projected to remain very high in several developing countries.

Different Asian Countries gain various impact from climate change. China, for example, benefits from a 1.5°C tempreture increase scenario accompanying with carbon fertilization and leading to a 3% gain of US$18 billion per year; however, India will face two thirds of the aggregate losses on agriculture because its high corp net revenue suffers from the high spring tempreture.

Due to climate change, livestock production will be decreased in Bangladesh by diseases, scarcity of forage, heat stress and breeding strategies.

Australia and New Zealand

Without further adaptation to climate change, projected impacts would likely be substantial. By 2030, production from agriculture and forestry was projected to decline over much of southern and eastern Australia, and over parts of eastern New Zealand. In New Zealand, initial benefits were projected close to major rivers and in western and southern areas.

Europe

For Southern Europe, it was predicted in 2007 that climate change would reduce crop productivity. In Central and Eastern Europe, forest productivity was expected to decline. In Northern Europe, the initial effect of climate change was projected to increase crop yields. The 2019 European Environment Agency report "Climate change adaptation in the agricultural sector in Europe" again confirmed this. According to this 2019 report, projections indicate that yields of non-irrigated crops like wheat, corn and sugar beet would decrease in southern Europe by up to 50% by 2050 (under a high-end emission scenario). This could result in a substantial decrease in farm income by that date. Also farmland values are projected to decrease in parts of southern Europe by more than 80% by 2100, which could result in land abandonment. The trade patterns are also said to be impacted, in turn affecting agricultural income. Also, increased food demand worldwide could exert pressure on food prices in the coming decades.

Latin America

The major agricultural products of Latin America include livestock and grains; such as maize, wheat, soybeans, and rice. Increased temperatures and altered hydrological cycles are predicted to translate to shorter growing seasons, overall reduced biomass production, and lower grain yields. Brazil, Mexico and Argentina alone contribute 70-90% of the total agricultural production in Latin America. In these and other dry regions, maize production is expected to decrease. A study summarizing a number of impact studies of climate change on agriculture in Latin America indicated that wheat is expected to decrease in Brazil, Argentina and Uruguay. Livestock, which is the main agricultural product for parts of Argentina, Uruguay, southern Brazil, Venezuela, and Colombia is likely to be reduced. Variability in the degree of production decrease among different regions of Latin America is likely. For example, one 2003 study that estimated future maize production in Latin America predicted that by 2055 maize in eastern Brazil will have moderate changes while Venezuela is expected to have drastic decreases.

Increased rainfall variability has been one of the most devastating consequences of climate change in Central America and Mexico. From 2009 to 2019, the region saw years of heavy rainfall in between years of below average rainfall. The spring rains of May and June have been particularly erratic, posing issues for farmers plant their maize crops at the onset of the spring rains. Most subsistence farmers in the region have no irrigation and thus depend on the rains for their crops to grow. In Mexico, only 21% of farms are irrigated, leaving the remaining 79% dependent on rainfall.

Suggested potential adaptation strategies to mitigate the impacts of global warming on agriculture in Latin America include using plant breeding technologies and installing irrigation infrastructure.

North America

Droughts are becoming more frequent and intense in arid and semiarid western North America as temperatures have been rising, advancing the timing and magnitude of spring snow melt floods and reducing river flow volume in summer. Direct effects of climate change include increased heat and water stress, altered crop phenology, and disrupted symbiotic interactions. These effects may be exacerbated by climate changes in river flow, and the combined effects are likely to reduce the abundance of native trees in favour of non-native herbaceous and drought-tolerant competitors, reduce the habitat quality for many native animals, and slow litter decomposition and nutrient cycling. Climate change effects on human water demand and irrigation may intensify these effects.

Contributions of agriculture to climate change

See also 

 2022 food crises
 Agroecology
 Climate change and invasive species
 Climate change and meat production
 Climate resilience
 Effects of climate change
 Effects of climate change on fisheries
 Environmental issues with agriculture
Special Report on Climate Change and Land (2019 IPCC report)

References

External links 
 Climate change (Food and Agriculture Organization of the United Nations)
 Climate adaptation & mitigation (CGIAR) 
 Climate-smart agriculture (Worldbank)

 
Effects of climate change
Potatoes